Meadows Foundation may refer to:
The Meadows Foundation (Dallas)
Meadows Foundation (New Jersey) in Somerset, NJ